In planetary geology, a pedestal crater is a crater with its ejecta sitting above the surrounding terrain and thereby forming a raised platform (like a pedestal). They form when an impact crater ejects material which forms an erosion-resistant layer, thus causing the immediate area to erode more slowly than the rest of the region. Some pedestals have been accurately measured to be hundreds of meters above the surrounding area. This means that hundreds of meters of material were eroded away. The result is that both the crater and its ejecta blanket stand above the surroundings. Pedestal craters were first observed during the Mariner missions.

Description 

With further study, researchers have divided related craters into three different classes. and have advanced ideas about how they were formed.  Excess ejecta craters and perched craters are larger than pedestal craters.  All three have similar shapes with the bowl of the crater and an area around the bowl sitting above the surrounding surface.  Excess ejecta craters and perched craters show ejecta deposits, but pedestal craters usually do not.  All are found in the same regions and all seem to lie the same distance above the surroundings—an average of close to 50 meters.
The main difference between excess ejecta craters and perched craters is that the bowls of perched craters are shallow and sometimes almost full of material.  Pedestal craters are near the center of a plateau that has an outward-facing scarp (cliff).

It is now believed that all three of these types of craters result from impacts into an icy layer.  Excess ejecta craters and perched craters, the larger ones, penetrated completely through the ice layer and also went into a rocky lower layer.  A portion of the rocky layer was deposited around the rim of the crater forming a rough ejecta deposit.  That ejecta protected the area beneath it from erosion.  Subsequent erosion left the craters sitting above the surrounding surface.  The smaller, "pedestal craters," developed a protective covering by a different process.  Simulations show that a large impact into ice would generate a great burst of heat that would be sufficient to melt some of the ice.  The resulting water could dissolve salts and minerals and produce a coating resistant to erosion.

This new understanding of how these different craters have formed has helped the scientists to understand how ice-rich material was deposited in the mid-latitudes of both hemispheres a number of times in the Amazonian period on Mars, for example.  During that time the obliquity (tilt) of the spin axis of Mars underwent many large variations.  These changes caused the climate to change.  With its current tilt, Mars has a thick deposit of ice at its poles.  At times, the poles face the sun causing the polar ice to move to the mid-latitudes; it is during these times that ice-rich layers were formed.

Gallery

See also 
 Geology of Mars
 Impact craters
 Impact event
 LARLE crater
 Martian Craters
 Rampart crater

References 
 

Planetary geology